European route E 77 is a part of the inter-European road system.

History 
In the version of the E-road network established in 1975, E77 was a much shorter road in Hungary from Püspökladány, E60 to Nyíregyháza, which is now part of E573. The section of current E77 between Gdańsk and Budapest was part of E75. When the E77 was first defined in this area, its north end was in Gdańsk.

Route 

The E 77 routes through several European countries:

 (Pskov Oblast)
: Pskov - Neyolovo - Izborsk - Shumilkino - / border

: / border - Määsi - Misso - Käbli - / border

: / border - Grundzāle - Sigulda - Riga
: Riga
: Riga - Jelgava - Eleja - / border

: / border - Plikiškės - Joniškis
Route 210:  Joniškis 
: Joniškis - Šiauliai
: Šiauliai
: Šiauliai - Kelmė - Tauragė - Panemune

 (Kaliningrad Oblast)
: Sovetsk - Talpaki
: Talpaki - Gvardeysk - Kaliningrad

: Kaliningrad - Gdańsk

: Gdańsk - Koszwały - Nowy Dwór Gdański - Elbląg - Ostróda - Olsztynek - Nidzica
: Nidzica - Mława - Strzegowo - Plonsk
: Płońsk
: Płońsk - Zakroczym
: Zakroczym - Czosnów
: Czosnów - Warsaw
: Warsaw - Sękocin Nowy
: Sękocin Nowy - Grójec
: Grójec - Białobrzegi - Radom - Skarżysko-Kamienna - Kielce - Chęciny - Jędrzejów
: Jędrzejów - Miechów - Kraków
: Kraków - Libertów
: Libertów - Mogilany - Myślenice
: Myślenice - Lubień
: Lubień - Rabka - Jabłonka - / border

: / border - Trstená
: Trstená
: Trstená - Dolný Kubín - Ružomberok - Banská Bystrica
: Banská Bystrica - Zvolen
: Zvolen
: Zvolen
: Zvolen - Devičie - Hokovce - / border

: / border - Hont - Rétság - Vác
: Vác - Budapest 
: Budapest

Improvements 
A bypass to the east of Panemunė and Sovetsk, incorporating new border control points and a new bridge over the Neman River, is under construction. After completion it will become part of the E77.

References

External links 
 UN Economic Commission for Europe: Overall Map of E-road Network (2007)

77
E77
E077
E077
E077
E077
E077
E077